Olu Akengboye was the 13th Olu of Warri who ruled over the Kingdom of Warri. He succeeded his father, Olu Omagboye (Miguel) as the 13th Olu of Warri. He took the title, Ogiame Akengboye. His Portuguese name was Agostinho Sabastiao Octobia. His son Olu Atogbuwa succeeded him around 1734.

References

Nigerian traditional rulers
People from Warri
Year of birth unknown
Year of death unknown